The 2016 season of the 3. divisjon, the fourth highest association football league for men in Norway.

Between 22 and 26 games (depending on group size) were played in 12 groups, with 3 points given for wins and 1 for draws. No group winners were promoted to the 2. divisjon; instead the number of teams in the 3. divisjon was harshly reduced to make it a new tier of regional groups. Up to 9 teams from groups of 12 were relegated, making the 2017 4. divisjon the new highest tier of locally constituted groups.

Teams

References
NIFS

Norwegian Third Division seasons
4
Norway
Norway